The Tenyo Maru was a 6,843-gross register ton passenger cargo ship built by Mitsubishi, Nagasaki for Toyo Kisen Kabushiki Kaisha in 1935. She was chartered to Mitsui and plied the New York route until she was requisitioned on 9 September 1941 by the Imperial Japanese Navy during World War II and converted at the Harima shipyard to a minelayer, which was completed on 31 October 1941.

Assigned to the Mine Division 19, of the Fourth Fleet, she landed troops at Makin Island. As part of the Rabaul invasion fleet, she carried air base construction materials.

Fate
Tenyo Maru was removed from the Navy List on 1 April 1942.

The bow of the ship was still visible above the water, at the end of the former Lae Airport in the 1970s.

Notes

External links
Chronological List of Japanese Merchant Vessel Losses
http://combinedfleet.com/Tenyo_t.htm

1935 ships
Minelayers of the Imperial Japanese Navy
Ships sunk by US aircraft
Shipwrecks of Papua New Guinea
Maritime incidents in March 1942